Evan Holyfield (born October 23, 1997) is an American professional boxer. He is the son of former two-division world champion of boxing, Evander Holyfield.

Background
Holyfield was born in Atlanta. He is the middle child of 11 total children that Evander Holyfield has fathered. His younger brother, Elijah Holyfield, is a running back for the Cincinnati Bengals  of the National Football League. Holyfield is represented professionally by Athelo Group, a sports agency based out of Connecticut.

Professional career
Holyfield made his professional debut on November 2, 2019, on the undercard of Canelo Álvarez vs. Sergey Kovalev at the MGM Grand Garden Arena in Paradise, Nevada. He scored a technical knockout (TKO) victory against Nick Wenstead at 16 seconds in the first round.

Professional boxing record

References 

Living people
1997 births
Boxers from Atlanta
Light-middleweight boxers
American male boxers